Osteochilus vittatoides is a species of cyprinid fish endemic to Borneo in Indonesia.

References

Taxa named by Canna Maria Louise Popta
Fish described in 1904
Osteochilus